Lillstreet Art Center is an arts center in Chicago, Illinois, United States. It is one of the oldest and most successful co-ops in Chicago and its facilities include classrooms for arts education, a gallery, an artist residency program, studio spaces, and a community outreach program.

History
The center began as a ceramics studio in a renovated horse barn on Lillstreet in 1975, by clay salesman, Bruce Robbins. The new facility has added metalsmithing & jewelry, painting & drawing, printmaking, textiles, glass, and digital arts & photography.

Lillstreet also houses First Slice Pie Café whose proceeds help fund First Slice which provides more than 300 lunches to people in need. First Slice also benefits from the annual Empty Bowls event which is hosted at Lillstreet and supported by Lillstreet potters who contribute bowls to the event.

In 2012, a  green roof was installed at the center. It was designed as a gravel path with plants on either side. In 2015, Lillstreet celebrated its 40th year in business.

Gallery exhibitions
Exhibitions at the Lillstreet Art Center include,
 Reformat: Digital Fabrication in Clay combined traditional ceramic techniques with digital fabrication such as 3D printing and computer-controlled routers.
 Neat: The Art of the Whiskey Vesselwas an exhibit of ceramic bottles, cups, flasks, jugs, and whiskey buckets.
 100 Acts of Sewing, an exhibit of the fiber artist, Sonya Phillip.
 Graphic Noise: Gig Posters from the Chicago Printers Guild, an exhibit of Chicago-based printmakers.
 Cairn & Cloud: A Collective Expression of Trauma and Hope was created by Corinne Peterson, and composed of clay and porcelain objects made by workshops members dealing with trauma and grief.
 Before I Die…, was an outdoor, chalkboard-based, art exhibit that encouraged passers-by to fill in the open-ended sentence. Originally conceived by artist Candy Chang.
 In the Penal Colony was Philip Glass' adaptation of Kafka's short story, staged by the Chicago Fringe Opera. The chamber opera was performed in the painting and drawing studio.

References

External links
 

1975 establishments in Illinois
Art museums and galleries in Chicago
Arts centers in Illinois